Premilcuore is a comune (municipality) in the Province of Forlì-Cesena in the Italian region Emilia-Romagna, located about  southeast of Bologna and about  southwest of Forlì.

History
Following a local tradition, the town was founded in the year 215 by a Roman centurion named "Marcelliano", who took refuge with some soldiers in the valley of Rabbi river. First mentioned in 1124, it was part of the Province of Florence, in Tuscany, until 1923.

Geography
Located at the borders of Romagna with Tuscany, Premilcuore is a little hill town of the Apennine Mountains, below the Alpe di San Benedetto and Falterona mountains. It borders the municipalities of Galeata, Portico e San Benedetto, Rocca San Casciano, San Godenzo (FI), and Santa Sofia. It counts the hamlet (frazione) of Ponte Fantella.

Demographics

Main sights
Main sights of Premilcuore include the medieval old town with its fortress (Rocca di Premilcuore), palaces and churches. The town is also part of the Foreste Casentinesi, Monte Falterona, Campigna National Park.

Personalities
Pietro Leoni (1909–1995), Jesuit priest

Media
The indie pop band Tiny Tide shoot the second part of their video "Road to fairies" in there.

References

External links

 Premilcuore official website

Cities and towns in Emilia-Romagna